Raytown is a city in Jackson County, Missouri, United States, and is a suburb of Kansas City. The population was at 30,012 in 2020 census. The mayor of Raytown is Michael McDonough and the mayor pro tem is Ryan Myers. It is part of the Kansas City metropolitan area.

History

The area where Raytown now lies was developed throughout the 19th century and early 20th century as pioneers moved westward along the Three Trails in search of available fertile lands and water. It was added to the state of Missouri at a cost of $800 by a treaty signed in 1826. Jackson County, named after President Andrew Jackson, was formed in 1827. 

A large section of the county, Township 49, was accidentally not offered for sale when the other townships were, and so was called "The Lost Township". People moved into the township and squatted until the township was surveyed and the land sold in 1843.
      
The pioneers and travelers moving westward down the Three Trails discovered an area of high, wooded ridges, in the Raytown area, that reminded them of their former homes in the Blue Ridge Mountains. The land was named Blue Ridge, with the bordering bodies of waters called the Big Blue and the Little Blue rivers.

The Rice-Tremonti Home, which still stands in Raytown today, was built on the Santa Fe Trail in 1844 by Archibald Rice and his family.

William Ray established a blacksmith shop on the Santa Fe Trail in Jackson County in about 1848. The settlement around the blacksmith shop was known first as "Ray's Town" and later as "Raytown" in 1854. (Now Fox's Drugs)

There is now a historical marker in Raytown at the corner of 63rd Street and Raytown Road showing the location of William Ray's shop.

In 1860, residents of Jackson County petitioned the county for a better road to connect southern Jackson County with Independence in northern Jackson County. The result was Raytown Road, which led north from High Grove Road, crossed the Little Blue River at the "rockford" (now inundated by Longview Lake) and joined the Santa Fe Trail at William Ray's blacksmith shop. Many portions of the original Raytown Road still are used today.

Geography

Demographics

2010 census

As of the census of 2010, there were 29,526 people, 12,104 households, and 7,701 families living in the city. The racial makeup of the city was 67.7% White, 25.1% African American, 0.5% Native American, 1.0% Asian, 0.2% Pacific Islander, 1.9% from other races, and 3.5% from two or more races. Hispanic or Latino of any race were 5.1% of the population.

There were 12,104 households, of which 30.3% had children under the age of 18 living with them, 41.4% were married couples living together, 16.9% had a female householder with no husband present, 5.3% had a male householder with no wife present, and 36.4% were non-families. 30.7% of all households were made up of individuals, and 12.3% had someone living alone who was 65 years of age or older. The average household size was 2.39 and the average family size was 2.97.

The median age in the city was 40.3 years. 23.1% of residents were under the age of 18; 8% were between the ages of 18 and 24; 24.9% were from 25 to 44; 27.8% were from 45 to 64; and 16.2% were 65 years of age or older. The gender makeup of the city was 47.3% male and 52.7% female.

2000 census
As of the census of 2000, there were 30,388 people, 12,855 households, and 8,304 families living in the city. The racial makeup of the city was 84.2% White, 11.7% African American, 0.4% Native American, 0.8% Asian, 0.2% Pacific Islander, 0.9% from other races, and 1.9% from two or more races. Hispanic or Latino of any race were 2.3% of the population.

There were 12,855 households, out of which 27.1% had children under the age of 18 living with them, 48.6% were married couples living together, 12.6% had a female householder with no husband present, and 35.4% were non-families. 30.3% of all households were made up of individuals, and 13.3% had someone living alone who was 65 years of age or older. The average household size was 2.32 and the average family size was 2.88.

In the city, the population was spread out, with 22.6% under the age of 18, 7.8% from 18 to 24, 27.9% from 25 to 44, 22.5% from 45 to 64, and 19.3% who were 65 years of age or older. The median age was 40 years. For every 100 females, there were 88.7 males. For every 100 females age 18 and over, there were 83.6 males.

The median income for a household in the city was $41,949, and the median income for a family was $50,952. Males had a median income of $33,828 versus $26,745 for females. The per capita income for the city was $21,634. About 3.1% of families and 5.0% of the population were below the poverty line, including 6.0% of those under age 18 and 2.6% of those age 65 or over.

Economy

Top employers
According to the town's 2014 Chamber of Commerce report, the top employers in the city are:

Education
The Raytown C-2 School District operates public schools, including Raytown High School and Raytown South High School.

Raytown has a public library, a branch of the Mid-Continent Public Library.

In popular culture
The 1980s television series Mama's Family took place in the fictional location of Raytown, although the U.S. state where Raytown is located is never mentioned. Based on the accents, it was set  in the South or Midwest.

References

External links
 The City of Raytown web site
 Raytown Area Chamber of Commerce

Cities in Jackson County, Missouri
Cities in Kansas City metropolitan area
Cities in Missouri